The Lesser Key of Solomon, also known as Lemegeton Clavicula Salomonis or simply Lemegeton, is an anonymous grimoire on demonology.  It was compiled in the mid-17th century, mostly from materials a couple of centuries older.  It is divided into five books—the Ars Goetia, Ars Theurgia-Goetia, Ars Paulina, Ars Almadel, and Ars Notoria.

Ars Goetia

Etymology 

The text is more properly called "Lemegeton Clavicula Salomonis, or, The little Key of Solomon". 
The title most commonly used, "The Lesser Key of Solomon," does not in fact occur in the manuscripts. A.E. Waite, in his 1898 Book of Black Magic and of Pacts does use the terms "so-called Greater Key" and "Lesser Key" to distinguish between the Clavicula Salomonis and Lemegeton, so he may have been the first one to coin it.  The Latin term  refers to the evocation of demons or evil spirits. It is derived from the Ancient Greek word  (goēteía) meaning “charm” "witchcraft" or "jugglery".

In medieval and Renaissance Europe, goetia was generally considered evil and heretical, in contrast to theurgia (theurgy) and magia naturalis (natural magic), which were sometimes considered more noble. Heinrich Cornelius Agrippa, in his Three Books of Occult Philosophy, writes "Now the parts of ceremonial magic are goetia and theurgia. Goetia is unfortunate, by the commerces of unclean spirits made up of the rites of wicked curiosities, unlawful charms, and deprecations, and is abandoned and execrated by all laws."

Sources
The most obvious source for the Ars Goetia is Johann Weyer's Pseudomonarchia Daemonum in his De praestigiis daemonum.  Weyer does not cite, and is unaware of, any other books in the Lemegeton, suggesting that the Lemegeton was derived from his work, not the other way around.  The order of the spirits changed between the two, four additional spirits were added to the later work, and one spirit (Pruflas) was omitted. The omission of Pruflas, a mistake that also occurs in an edition of Pseudomonarchia Daemonum cited in Reginald Scot's The Discovery of Witchcraft, indicates that the Ars Goetia could not have been compiled before 1570. Indeed, it appears that the Ars Goetia is more dependent upon Scott's translation of Weyer than on Weyer's work in itself.  Additionally, some material came from Heinrich Cornelius Agrippa's Three Books of Occult Philosophy, the Heptameron by pseudo-Pietro d'Abano, and the Magical Calendar.

Weyer's Officium Spirituum, which is likely related to a 1583 manuscript titled The Office of Spirits, appears to have ultimately been an elaboration on a 15th-century manuscript titled Livre des Esperitz (30 of the 47 spirits are nearly identical to spirits in the Ars Goetia).

In a slightly later copy made by Thomas Rudd (1583?–1656), this portion was labelled "Liber Malorum Spirituum seu Goetia", and the seals and demons were paired with those of the 72 angels of the Shem HaMephorash which were intended to protect the conjurer and to control the demons he summoned.  The angelic names and seals derived from a manuscript by Blaise de Vigenère, whose papers were also used by Samuel Liddell MacGregor Mathers (1854-1918) in his works for the Hermetic Order of the Golden Dawn  (1887–1903). Rudd may have derived his copy of Liber Malorum Spirituum from a now-lost work by Johannes Trithemius, who taught Agrippa, who in turn taught Weyer.

This portion of the work was later translated by Samuel Liddell MacGregor Mathers and published by Aleister Crowley in 1904 under the title The Book of the Goetia of Solomon the King.  Crowley added some additional invocations previously unrelated to the original work (including some evocations in the Enochian language), as well as essays describing the rituals as psychological exploration instead of demon summoning.

The Seventy-Two Demons 

The demons' names (given below) are taken from the Ars Goetia, which differs in terms of number and ranking from the Pseudomonarchia Daemonum of Weyer. As a result of multiple translations, there are multiple spellings for some of the names, which are given in the articles concerning them. The demons Vassago, Seere, Dantalion, and Andromalius are new additions in Ars Goetia that are not present in the Pseudomonarchia Daemonum that it is based upon, whereas the demon Pruflas appears in the Pseudomonarchia Daemonum but not in Ars Goetia.

 King Bael
 Duke Agares
 Prince Vassago
 Marquis Samigina
 President Marbas
 Duke Valefor
 Marquis Amon
 Duke Barbatos
 King Paimon
 President Buer
 Duke Gusion
 Prince Sitri
 King Beleth
 Marquis Leraje
 Duke Eligos
 Duke Zepar
 Count/President Botis
 Duke Bathin
 Duke Sallos
 King Purson
 Count/President Morax
 Count/Prince Ipos
 Duke Aim
 Marquis Naberius
 Count/President Glasya-Labolas
 Duke Buné
 Marquis/Count Ronové
 Duke Berith
 Duke Astaroth
 Marquis Forneus
 President Foras
 King Asmodeus
 Prince/President Gäap
 Count Furfur
 Marquis Marchosias
 Prince Stolas
 Marquis Phenex
 Count Halphas
 President Malphas
 Count Räum
 Duke Focalor
 Duke Vepar
 Marquis Sabnock
 Marquis Shax
 King/Count Viné
 Count Bifrons
 Duke Vual
 President Haagenti
 Duke Crocell
 Knight Furcas
 King Balam
 Duke Alloces
 President Caim
 Duke/Count Murmur
 Prince Orobas
 Duke Gremory
 President Ose
 President Amy
 Marquis Orias
 Duke Vapula
 King/President Zagan
 President Valac
 Marquis Andras
 Duke Flauros
 Marquis Andrealphus
 Marquis Kimaris
 Duke Amdusias
 King Belial
 Marquis Decarabia
 Prince Seere
 Duke Dantalion
 Count Andromalius

A footnote in one variant edition lists the kings of the cardinal directions as Oriens or Uriens, Paymon or Paymonia, Ariton or Egyn, and Amaymon or Amaimon, alternatively known as Samael, Azazel, Azael, and Mahazael (purportedly their preferred rabbinic names). Agrippa's Occult Philosophy lists the kings of the cardinal directions as Urieus (east), Amaymon (south), Paymon (west), and Egin (north); again providing the alternate names Samuel (i.e. Samael), Azazel, Azael, and Mahazuel. The Magical Calendar lists them as Bael, Moymon, Poymon, and Egin, though Peterson notes that some variant editions instead list: "Asmodel in the east, Amaymon in the south, Paymon in the west, and Aegym in the north"; "Oriens, Paymon, Egyn, and Amaymon"; or "Amodeo  (king of the east), Paymon (king of the west), Egion (king of the north), and Maimon."

Ars Theurgia Goetia 
The Ars Theurgia Goetia mostly derives from Trithemius's Steganographia, though the seals and order of the spirits are different due to corrupted transmission via manuscript.  Rituals not found in Steganographia were added, in some ways conflicting with similar rituals found in the Ars Goetia and Ars Paulina. Most of the spirits summoned are tied to compass points: four emperors are tied to the cardinal points (Carnesiel in the east, Amenadiel in the west, Demoriel in the north and Caspiel in the south); and sixteen dukes are tied to cardinal points, inter-cardinal points, and additional directions between those. There are in addition eleven "wandering princes", so that a total of thirty-one spirit leaders each rule several spirits, up to a few dozen.

Ars Paulina 
Derived from book three of Trithemius's Steganographia and from portions of the Heptameron, but purportedly delivered by Paul the Apostle instead of (as claimed by Trithemius) Raziel.  Elements from The Magical Calendar, astrological seals by Robert Turner's 1656 translation of Paracelsus's Archidoxes of Magic, and repeated mentions of guns and the year 1641 indicate that this portion was written in the later half of the seventeenth century.  Traditions of Paul communicating with heavenly powers are almost as old as Christianity itself, as seen in some interpretations of 2 Corinthians 12:2–4 and the apocryphal Apocalypse of Paul.  The Ars Paulina is in turn divided into two books, the first detailing twenty-four angels aligned with the twenty-four hours of the day, the second (derived more from the Heptameron) detailing the 360 spirits of the degrees of the zodiac.

Ars Almadel 
Mentioned by Trithemius and Weyer, the latter of whom claimed an Arabic origin for the work.  A 15th-century copy is attested to by Robert H.Turner, and Hebrew copies were discovered in the 20th century.  The Ars Almadel instructs the magician on how to create a wax tablet with specific designs intended to contact angels via scrying.

Ars Notoria 
The Ars Notoria contains a series of prayers (related to those in The Sworn Book of Honorius) intended to grant eidetic memory and instantaneous learning to the magician.  Some copies and editions of the Lemegeton omit this work entirely; A. E. Waite ignores it completely when describing the Lemegeton. It is also known as the Ars Nova.

Editions 
 Crowley, Aleister (ed.), S. L. MacGregor Mathers (transcribed) The Book of the Goetia of Solomon the King. Translated into the English tongue by a dead hand (Foyers, Inverness: Society for the Propagation of Religious Truth, 1904) 1995 reprint: .
 Greenup, A. W., "The Almadel of Solomon, according to the text of the Sloane MS. 2731" The Occult Review vol. 22 no. 2, August 1915, 96–102.
 Henson, Mitch (ed.) Lemegeton. The Complete Lesser Key of Solomon (Jacksonville: Metatron Books, 1999) .  Noted by Peterson to be "uncritical and indiscriminate in its use of source material".
 de Laurence, L. W. (ed.), The Lesser Key Of Solomon, Goetia, The Book of Evil Spirits (Chicago: de Laurence, Scott & Co., 1916) 1942 reprint: ; 2006 reprint: . A plagiarism of the Mathers/Crowley edition.
 Peterson, Joseph H. (ed.), The Lesser Key of Solomon: Lemegeton Clavicula Salomonis (York Beach, ME: Weiser Books, 2001). Considered "the definitive version" and "the standard edition".
 Runyon, Carroll, The Book of Solomon’s Magick (Silverado, CA: C.H.S. Inc., 1996). Targeted more toward practicing magicians than academics, claims that the demons were originally derived from Mesopotamian mythology.
 Shah, Idries, The Secret Lore of Magic (London: Abacus, 1972). Contains portions of Ars Almandel and split sections the Goetia, missing large portions of the rituals involved.
 Skinner, Stephen & Rankine, David (eds.), The Goetia of Dr Rudd: The Angels and Demons of Liber Malorum Spirituum Seu Goetia (Sourceworks of Ceremonial Magic) (London and Singapore: The Golden Hoard Press 2007) 
 Thorogood, Alan (ed.), Frederick Hockley (transcribed), The Pauline Art of Solomon (York Beach, ME: The Teitan Press, 2016)
 Veenstra, Jan R. “The Holy Almandal. Angels and the intellectual aims of magic” in Jan N. Bremmer and Jan R. Veenstra (eds.), The Metamorphosis of Magic from Late Antiguity to the Early Modern Period (Leuven: Peeters, 2002), pp. 189–229. The Almadel is transcribed at pp. 217–229.
 Waite, Arthur Edward, The Book of Black Magic and of Pacts. Including the rites and mysteries of goëtic theurgy, sorcery, and infernal necromancy, also the rituals of black magic (Edinburgh: 1898). Reprinted as The Secret Tradition in Goëtia. The Book of Ceremonial Magic, including the rites and mysteries of Goëtic theurgy, sorcery, and infernal necromancy (London: William Rider & Son, 1911). Includes the Goetia, Pauline Art and Almadel.
 White, Nelson & Anne (eds.) Lemegeton: Clavicula Salomonis: or, The complete lesser key of Solomon the King (Pasadena, CA: Technology Group, 1979). Noted by Peterson to be "almost totally unreadable".
 Wilby, Kevin (ed.) The Lemegetton. A Medieval Manual of Solomonic Magic (Silian, Lampeter: Hermetic Research Series, 1985)

See also
 The Book of Abramelin
 Grimoire
 List of magical terms and traditions
 Works of Aleister Crowley

Explanatory notes

Citations

Works cited 
 Aleister Crowley (ed.), Samuel Liddell Mathers (trans.),  The Goetia: The Lesser Key of Solomon the King. York Beach, ME : Samuel Weiser (1995) .
 E. J. Langford Garstin, Theurgy or The Hermetic Practice: A Treatise on Spiritual Alchemy. Berwick: Ibis Press, 2004.  (Published posthumously)
 Stephen Skinner,  & David Rankine, The Goetia of Dr Rudd: The Angels and Demons of Liber Malorum Spirituum Seu Goetia (Sourceworks of Ceremonial Magic). Golden Hoard Press, 2007.

External links 
 J. B. Hare, online edition (2002, sacred-texts.com)
 Joseph H. Peterson, online edition (1999)
 Demon list with descriptions

17th-century books
Demonological literature
Grimoires
Goetia
Solomon